If Tomorrow Comes is a 1985 crime fiction novel by American author Sidney Sheldon. It is a story portraying an ordinary woman who is framed by the Mafia, her subsequent quest for vengeance towards them and her later life as a con artist. The novel was adapted into a three-part TV miniseries with the same name in 1986, starring Madolyn Smith and Tom Berenger.

Plot
Tracy is a successful bank-worker in Philadelphia, engaged to a wealthy heir, whose child she is carrying. Then her mother commits suicide, after being scammed by the New Orleans Mafia and left in debt. Tracy gets a gun to frighten the scammer, Joe Romano, into admitting her mother’s innocence, but he tries to rape her and is wounded in the struggle. Her attorney convinces her that she will get a much shorter sentence if she pleads guilty, but the judge sentences her to fifteen years to Southern Louisiana Penitentiary for Women, and she realises that the judge and the attorney are both working for Romano’s boss, mafia Don Anthony Orsatti. As she goes to jail, her employer and her fiancé abandon her and the unborn child, which she miscarries under the horrendous abuse she suffers from her prison mates. 
 
Tracy now decides to avenge herself on all the men who have ruined her life. Granted an official pardon for saving the life of the warden's daughter, she uses her banking knowledge to divert large sums into Romano’s account, making it look as though he was planning to escape the country, and Orsatti imprisons him for his apparent betrayal. Then she gets the boyfriend of one of her jail-mates to plant evidence in the attorney’s home, making it look as though he was cheating Orsatti at cards, and Orsatti teaches him a lesson too. While the judge is in Russia, she sends him coded letters that implicate him as a spy, and he is sentenced to fourteen years of hard labor in Siberia. She stalks her ex-fiancé and his new wife, but decides that they look so bored and unhappy with each other that no further punishment is needed.

With a criminal record, however, her career is over, and she reluctantly slips into crime, presently finding that she enjoys stealing, especially from those who deserve to be stolen from. In the course of a colorful crime spree all over Europe with FBI, INTERPOL and Federal Police stalking, she falls in love with one of her co-conspirators, Jeff Stevens, and they plan to take their winnings and live the law-abiding life in Brazil. But on the plane, she finds herself sitting next to wealthy top criminal Maximilian Pierpont, who shows a strong interest in her, and we are left wondering if she will try to steal from him too.

Characters

 Tracy Whitney: The protagonist. An ex-banker who is falsely implicated and sent to jail. Upon her release, after a number of unsuccessful attempts to procure a job, she reluctantly becomes a con artist. Soon enough, she becomes one of the best in the world.
 Jeff Stevens: A fellow con artist and Tracy's love interest
 Joe Romano: A member of the New Orleans Mafia. He works for the mafia don Anthony Orsatti 
 Anthony Orsatti: The don of the New Orleans Mafia

Adaptation

The novel was adapted into the three-part TV miniseries If Tomorrow Comes in 1986, starring Madolyn Smith and Tom Berenger.

The Malayalam film 22 Female Kottayam was inspired by this novel. The film was remade into Tamil as Malini 22 Palayamkottai which itself was dubbed into Telugu as Ghatana.

Sequels
Author Tilly Bagshawe has written two novels featuring the Tracy Whitney character: Sidney Sheldon's Chasing Tomorrow (2014) and Sidney Sheldon's Reckless (2015).

References

1985 American novels
Novels by Sidney Sheldon
American novels adapted into television shows